The Holland Track, also known as the John Holland Way, is a bush track between Broomehill and Coolgardie in Western Australia.

The track was pioneered by John Holland in 1893 as a short cut through to the Goldfields.

References

Tracks in remote areas of Western Australia
Goldfields-Esperance
Great Southern (Western Australia)
Wheatbelt (Western Australia)
1893 establishments in Australia
Great Western Woodlands